Tegallalang is a district in the Gianyar Regency, Bali, Indonesia. As of the 2010 census, the area was 61.80 km2 and the population was 50,625; the latest official estimate (as at mid 2019) is 53,760.
Located around 10 km north of Ubud, its terraced rice fields are a tourist attraction in the area.

Gallery

References

Districts of Bali
Gianyar Regency
Populated places in Bali